Michael Lado Thomas Allah-Jabu (born 01/01/1972) is a South Sudanese Politician. He is currently the Mayor of Juba City Council in Central Equatoria State as of 2023. His Worship: Allah-Jabu was appointed by Central Equatoria State Governor, Emmanuel Adil Anthony in November 19th, 2021, replacing Maulana Kalisto Lado who was removed in a gubernatorial decree.

Early life and education 
Worship Allah-Jabu was born in Luwala Boma of Lobonok Payam in Juba County of Central Equatoria State to Late: Thomas Kulang Allah-Jabu and Late 'Diko Ajuda from Limi Clan (Kangapo (1) Payam)-Kajo-Keji County of Central Equatoria State.

He started his education at Lobonok Elementary Primary school from 1979 to 1982. He later joined Motoyo Primary School in Nimule Town of Eastern Equatoria State when his uncle (Awad Abbas Mursal) migrated there in 1982, where he completed his primary leaving education.

He later joined Rei Intermediate School in Nimule Town in 1985. He then returned to Juba following the assassination of

Career 
He first became the Chairperson (Sheikh Al-Hella) of Buluk Quarter Council in 2009 where he served for nine (9) years in which he contributed in the Sudan National Elections in 2010 and the 2011 referendum that led to the independence of South Sudan.

In 2011, Michael Allah-Jabu was first elected as the Speaker of Juba City Legislative Council where he served for two terms up to 2018.

In 2018, he was then  appointed in a gubernatorial decree by then Governor of Jubek State, Augustino Jadalla Wani as Deputy Commissioner General for Insurance and Regulatory Authority under the Defunct Jubek State.

Press Secretary in the presidency (Office of the Vice President for Economic Cluster Dr. James Wani Igga for about a year.

On 19th November 2021, he then became the New Mayor of Juba City Council through an order.

Personal Motto 
His Worship Allah-Jabu is well-known for his strive for development under his personal motto "Together for Services Delivery and Urban Development".

Achievements

References

1972 births
Living people
South Sudanese politicians
People from Juba